Korben Dallas is a Slovak rock band from Bratislava formed in 2010 by musicians who had previously played together in the art rock band called Appendix. During its existence, the band has so far released 7 albums. The band gained popularity in 2013 with their hit song Otec ("Father"). The band regularly performs at Slovak and Czech music festivals (Pohoda, Grape, Topfest, Colours of Ostrava).
In 2011, the group released their debut album Pekné cesty. The album originated from a concert live recording and was nominated as an album of the year at Radio Head Awards.

Discography 
Albums

All albums published by Slnko records, aside from the band's first album, Pekné cesty, which was published by Hevhetia.

 2011: Pekné cesty ("Pleasant Journeys"), live album
 2013: Karnevalová vrana ("Carnival Crow"), studio album
 2014: Banská Bystrica (named after the Slovak town), studio album
 2015: Kam ideme ("Where We're Going"), studio album made in collaboration with the Slovak Radio Symphony Orchestra
 2017: Stredovek ("Middle Ages"), studio album
 2019: Bazén ("Swimming Pool"), studio album
 2022: Deti rýb ("The Children of Fish"), studio album

Members 
 Juraj Benetin – vocals, guitar
 Lukáš Fila – bass guitar
 Igor "Ozo" Guttler – drums
 Ľuboslav Petruška – guitar

References

External links 

 Korben Dallas at slnkorecords.sk
 Korben Dallas at bandzone.cz

Musical groups established in 2010
Slovak rock music groups
2010 establishments in Slovakia